The SAP Sales Cloud, formerly CallidusCloud, is an enterprise software and software as a service (SaaS) company headquartered in Dublin, California. The company markets services for sales effectiveness, sales management and sales execution (CPQ, CLM) software and services.

History

Origins 

Callidus Software Inc. was incorporated in Delaware on September 6, 1996 by founders Andrew Swett and Scott Kitayama to provide Enterprise Incentive Management (EIM) application systems. Initial funding came from Onset Ventures. The first hire was former Chief Architect Greg Holmberg, followed by former President and CEO Reed D. Taussig.

In November 2003, the company had its Initial public offering on the Nasdaq National Market under the stock symbol CALD, raising US$70 million.

After acquiring Litmos in June 2011, Callidus Cloud adopted the name Litmos. After being acquired by SAP in 2019, the product's name changed again to SAP Litmos.

On January 30, 2018, it was announced the company SAP acquired CallidusCloud for $2.4 billion.

Products and services 

CallidusCloud provides Software as a Service (SaaS) products for marketing and sales effectiveness. This includes applications to identify the business leads, ensure proper territory and quota distribution, enable sales forces, as well as other features. The company offers applications for customer satisfaction monitoring, sales gamification, and a learning management system including content authoring system.
Callidus' partner companies include Adobe, Accenture and Canidium LLC.

Awards and recognition
 2019 Gartner Magic Quadrant - A 6x Leader In The Sales Performance Management Market.
 2018 Gartner Magic Quadrant - A Leader In The Sales Performance Management Market.
2017 Stevie Awards 14 Gold Stevie Awards in the American Business Awards and 56 wins in total, including the Stevie for Customer Service Department of the Year, Management Team of the Year, Company of the Year, Fastest Growing Company of the Year, Tech Innovator of the Year and Executive of the Year.
 2017 Gartner Magic Quadrant - A Leader In The Sales Performance Management Market.
 2017 Forrester Research: Configure-Price-Quote 
2016 Stevie Awards 6 Gold Stevie Awards in the American Business Awards and 41 wins in total, including the Stevie for Organization of the Year.
 2016 Gartner Magic Quadrant - A Leader In The Sales Performance Management Market.
 2015 Stevie Awards 6 Gold Stevies in the 2015 International Business Awards and Gold winner in Executive of the Year category in the American Business Awards.
 2015 Gartner Magic Quadrant - A Leader In The Sales Performance Management Market.
 2014 Stevie Awards 4 Gold Stevies in the 2014 International Business Awards and 14 wins total in the American business awards.
 2014 CIO Review -  Top 100 Most Promising Big Data Companies
 2013 Gartner Magic Quadrant - A Leader In The Sales Performance Management Market.
 2013 Stevie Awards Gold 'Grand Stevie' for the 10 most successful companies and 19 wins in total across the international and American business awards.
 2012 Stevie Awards Best Cloud App/Service, Best Financial Management Solution for its Sales Effectiveness Suite.
 2012 Codie award - Best Cloud Application/Service, Human Capital Management Solution, Financial Management Solution
 2011 Codie award - Best Cloud Infrastructure Application

References

External links 
 CallidusCloud.com
Litmos.com

Software companies based in the San Francisco Bay Area
Companies based in Pleasanton, California
Software companies established in 1996
1996 establishments in California
2003 initial public offerings
Cloud computing providers
Business software companies
Companies formerly listed on the Nasdaq
SAP SE acquisitions
2018 mergers and acquisitions
American subsidiaries of foreign companies
Defunct software companies of the United States